Lintneria biolleyi is a moth of the  family Sphingidae. It is known from Costa Rica and Guatemala.

The wingspan is about 90 mm. It is similar to Lintneria lugens, but differing in the details of the pattern. The forewing upperside is brown, speckled with pale buff, and the hindwing upperside is mostly black.

The larvae probably feed on Lamiaceae (such as Salvia, Mentha, Monarda and Hyptis), Hydrophylloideae (such as Wigandia) and Verbenaceae species (such as Verbena and Lantana).

References

Lintneria
Moths described in 1912